Cài is a Chinese-language surname that derives from the name of the ancient Cai state. In 2019 it was the 38th most common surname in China, but the 9th most common in Taiwan (as of 2018), where it is usually romanized as "Tsai" (based on Wade-Giles romanization of Standard Mandarin), "Tsay", or "Chai" and the 8th most common in Singapore, where it is usually romanized as "Chua", which is based on its Teochew and Hokkien pronunciation. Koreans use Chinese-derived family names and in Korean, Cai is 채 in Hangul, "Chae" in Revised Romanization, It is also a common name in Hong Kong where it is romanized as "Choy", "Choi" or "Tsoi". In Macau, it is spelled as "Choi". In Malaysia, it is romanized as "Choi" from the Cantonese pronunciation, and "Chua" or "Chuah" from the Hokkien or Teochew pronunciation. It is romanized in the Philippines as "Chua" or "Chuah", and in Thailand as "Chuo" (ฉั่ว). Moreover, it is also romanized in Cambodia as either "Chhay" or "Chhor" among people of full Chinese descent living in Cambodia and as "Tjoa" or "Chua" in Indonesia.

History

The Chois are said to be the descendants of the 5th son of King Wen of Zhou, Ji Du. Ji Du was awarded the title of marquis (hóu) of the State of Cai (centered on what is now Shangcai, Zhumadian, Henan, China), and he was known as Cai Shu Du ("Uncle Du of Cai"). Together with Guan Shu and Huo Shu, they were known as the Three Guards. When King Wu died, his son King Cheng was too young and his uncle, the Duke of Zhou, became regent. Seeing that the power of the Duke of Zhou was increasing, the Three Guards got jealous and rebelled against Zhou together with Wu Geng. The Duke of Zhou suppressed the rebellion, and Cai Shu was exiled. King Cheng reestablished Cai Shu's son Wu or Hu as the new Duke of Cai. Some 600 years later in the Warring States period, the State of Chu conquered Cai in 447 BC and was itself conquered by the Qin state which, in turn, formed the Qin Empire, China's first empire. With the spread of family names to all social classes in the new empire, many people of the former state of Cai began to bear it as a surname.

The Cai descendants have undertaken the following two major migrations. During the Huang Chao Rebellion (AD 875) at the end of the Tang dynasty (AD 618–907), the Cai clan migrated to Guangdong and Fujian provinces. Another later migration occurred when Ming dynasty loyalist Koxinga moved military officials surnamed Cai and their families to Taiwan in the 17th century. As a result, the surname is far more common in these areas and in areas settled by their descendants (e.g., Southeast Asia) than in other parts of China.

Transliteration and romanization

Chinese
Cai is written the same (蔡) in both simplified and traditional Chinese characters.

In Mandarin Chinese, the surname is transliterated as Cài in pinyin and Tongyong Pinyin, Ts'ai in Wade-Giles, and Tsay in Gwoyeu Romatzyh. In Southern Min or Taiwanese, it is Chhoà in Pe̍h-oē-jī. In Cantonese (Hong Kong and Macau), it is Coi3 in Jyutping and Choi in Yale. (This should not be confused with the predominantly Korean family name Choi which has a different character [崔]). In Hakka it is Tshai in Pha̍k-fa-sṳ. (In Tongyong pinyin, it is Cai in Siyen Hakka and Ca̱i in Hoiliuk Hakka.) In Fuzhou dialect, it is Chái (in Bàng-uâ-cê).

Other languages
Koreans use Chinese-derived family names and in Korean, Cai is 채 in Hangul, Chae in Revised Romanization, and Ch'ae in McCune-Reischauer.

Vietnamese also use Chinese-derived family names. In Vietnamese, the name is Thái. The Chinese name 蔡 is usually transliterated via Sino-Vietnamese as Thái but sometimes as Sái.

Japanese do not use Chinese family names but for Chinese in Japan who carry the name, it is さい in Hiragana and Sai in the major romanization systems.

Romanization
Cai is romanized as Cai in the People's Republic of China, Tsai (or occasionally Tsay or Chai for Mandarin) or Tsoa in the Taiwan, and Choi or Choy in Hong Kong and Malaysia. In Malaysia, Singapore, and Brunei, the most common forms are Chua or Chuah for Teochew and Hokkien speakers, Chai for Hakka speakers, Choi or Tsoi for Cantonese speakers, and Toy or Toi for Taishanese speakers. In Indonesia, it is usually romanized as Tjoa/Tjhoa/Tjoea/Tjhoea (Hokkien & Teochew), Tjhoi (Cantonese) or Tjhai (Hakka) with Dutch spelling, or Tjua/Tjhua (Hokkien & Teochew) with old Indonesian spelling, or Chua (Hokkien & Teochew), Choy/Choi (Cantonese) or Chai (Hakka) with current Indonesian spelling. In the Philippines, it is Chua  or Cua ( or ). Chua is pronounced  in other Anglophone countries outside the Philippines.

Other variations include Chye and Coi.

Derivative names
In addition, some of the Chuas (Cais) who resided in the Philippines adopted Spanish names to avoid persecution by the Spanish rulers during the Philippines' Spanish colonial rule from the early 16th to late 19th century. Hispanicized forms of the name include Chuachiaco, Chuakay, Chuapoco, Chuaquico, Chuacuco, Tuazon, Chuateco, and Chuatoco. These names were formed from the surname, one character of the given name, and the suffix "-co", a Minnan honorific ko (哥), literally meaning "older brother".

In Thailand, most Thais of Chinese descendance use Thai surnames. Legislation by Siamese King Rama VI (r. 1910–1925) required the adoption of Thai surnames which was largely directed at easing tensions with Chinese community by encouraging assimilation. Thai law did not (and does not) allow identical surnames to those already in existence, so ethnic Chinese formerly surnamed Chua incorporating words that sound like "Chua" and have good meaning (such as Chai, meaning "victory") into much longer surnames.

After Suharto came to power, his regime created many anti-Chinese legislations in Indonesia. One of them was 127/U/Kep/12/1966 which strongly encouraged ethnic Chinese living in Indonesia to adopt Indonesian-sounding names instead of the standard three-word or two-word Chinese names. Many Indonesianized names are Chinese surname syllables with western or Indonesian prefix or suffix – resulting in many exotic-sounding names. Although two Chinese individuals shared the same Chinese surname, they may employ different strategies for the Indonesian-sounding names. For example, Indonesianized forms of Cai include Tjuatja, Cuaca, Tjuandi, Cuandi, Tjahjana, Tjahja, etc. Despite the Indonesianization, the Chinese surnames are still used today by the Chinese-Indonesian diaspora overseas (mostly in the Netherlands, Germany, and USA); by those Chinese-Indonesians courageous enough during Suharto's regime to keep their Chinese names (e.g., Kwik Kian Gie), or by those who couldn't afford to process the name change through Indonesia's civil bureaucracy. After Suharto resigned from the presidency, subsequent governments revoked the ban on the ethnic Chinese from speaking and learning Chinese in public. Using the original Chinese surnames is no longer a taboo but only a small minority have decided to re-adopt the original Chinese surnames of their grandparents or to use the Mandarin Chinese pinyin romanization, pronunciation and spelling and most retain their changed names as the post-1965 generations have been culturally Indonesianized.

Notable people

 Cai Cheng, a Chinese politician
 Cai Chusheng, an early Chinese film director
 Cai E, a Chinese revolutionary and warlord in early 20th century
 Cai Feihu, Chinese professor, engineer and businessman
 Cai Gongshi, a Chinese emissary killed by Japanese soldiers during the Jinan Incident
 Cai Guo-Qiang, a Chinese contemporary artist and curator.
 Cai Hesen, an early leader of the Chinese Communist Party and a friend and comrade of Mao Zedong
 Cai Jing, a Song dynasty official and a character in the Chinese literature classic the Water Margin
 Lady Cai, the wife of Han dynasty provincial governor Liu Biao
 Cai Lun, the inventor of paper in the Han dynasty
 Cai Mao, a man of the gentry who served under Han dynasty provincial governor Liu Biao, cousin of Cai He and Cai Zhong
 Cai Pei, a diplomat and politician in the Republic of China
 Cai Qi, a Chinese politician
 Cai Qian, a Chinese pirate in the Qing dynasty
 Cai Shangjun, a Chinese film director and screenwriter
 Cai Shu, a Chinese high jumper
 Cai Tingkai, a Chinese general during the Republican era
 Cai Wenji, a Han dynasty poet and composer also known as Cai Yan, daughter of scholar Cai Yong
 Cai Xiang, a calligrapher, scholar, official and poet during the Song dynasty also known as Cai Zhonghui
 Cai Xitao, a Chinese botanist
 Cai Xukun, a Chinese actor, singer and song composer, former leader and center of Chinese boy group Nine Percent
 Cai Xuzhe, a Chinese astronaut
 Cai Yong, a Han dynasty scholar and father of Cai Wenji
 Cai Yuanpei, a chancellor of Peking University and first president of the Chinese Academy of Sciences (Academic Sinica)
 Cai Yun, a Chinese badminton player
 Cai Zhuohua, a Chinese Christian preacher
 Chae Je-gong, a Joseon dynasty scholar, writer, politician
 Chae Myung-shin, a South Korean army officer
 Chae Su-chan, a South Korean politician and scholar
 Chai Trong-rong or Trong Chai, a Taiwanese politician
 Ada Choi, a Hong Kong actress
 Charlene Choi, a Hong Kong singer, member of the Twins duo
 Choi Chi-sum, a Hong Kong evangelist
 Fátima Choi, a Macanese government minister
 Sandra Choi, an English creative director and designer for shoemaker Jimmy Choo Ltd
 Richard Tsoi, a Hong Kong activist and polictican
 Vin Choi, a Hong Kong actor
 Choi York Yee, a Hong Kong footballer and sports commentator
 Anna Choy, an Australian actress, TV presenter, and Australia Day Ambassador
 Elizabeth Choy, a North Borneo-born Singaporean World War II heroine
 Choy So-yuk, a Hong Kong politician
 Choy Weng Yang, a Singaporean artist
 Alfrancis Chua, a Filipino basketball coach
 Amy Chua, an American academic and author of Filipino Chinese descent
 Brent Chua, a Filipino model
 Dexmon Chua, Singaporean murder victim
 Chua Ek Kay, a Singaporean artist
 Chua En Lai (born 1979), a Singaporean actor
 Glen Chua, a Canadian film director, actor, and writer
 Joi Chua (Joi Tsai), a Singaporean singer
 Jonathan Chua (Jon Chua JX / Jonny X), a Singaporean musician & entrepreneur
 Chua, Carlo Dino, a Filipino former vice mayor of Cavite
 Chua Jui Meng (born 1943), a Malaysian health minister and prominent politician
 Chua Lam, a Singaporean-born Hong Kong columnist and movie producer
 Chua Leong Aik, Singaporean murder accomplice
 Chua, Leon O., an American professor and inventor of Chua's circuit
 Simon Chua Ling Fung, a bodybuilder from Singapore
 Death of Mark Chua, a Filipino murder victim
 Paige Chua (born 1981), a Singaporean model and actress
 Paul Chua, a Singaporean bodybuilder
 Chua Phung Kim, a Singaporean weightlifter
 Robert Chua, a Singapore-born Asian television executive
Chua Ser Lien, Singaporean kidnapper
 Chua Sock Koong, a Singaporean telecom executive
 Chua Soi Lek, a Malaysian health minister and prominent politician, former Member of Parliament for Labis
 Chua Soon Bui, a Malaysian politician
 Tanya Chua, a Singaporean singer
 Chua Tee Yong, a Malaysian politician, former Member of Parliament for Labis
 Chua Tian Chang, or Tian Chua, a Malaysian politician, former Member of Parliament for Batu
Chua Yee Ling, a Malaysian politician, former Member of Perak State Assembly for Kuala Sapetang
Chua Wei Kiat, a Malaysian politician, Member of Selangor State Assembly for Rawang and State Chairman for AMK's Selangor Chief
 Tricia Chuah, a Malaysian squash player
 Chuah Guat Eng, a Malaysian novelist
 Hirokazu Nakaima, Governor of Okinawa Prefecture; Nakaima is descended from a Chinese family with the surname of Cai, one of the 36 Han Chinese Kumemura families who moved to Okinawa in 1392.
 Sai On, a scholar-bureaucrat official of the Ryūkyū Kingdom
 Sai Taku, a scholar-bureaucrat official of the Ryūkyū Kingdom
 David Thai, a Vietnamese-American gangster
 Minh Thai, a Vietnamese-American speedcuber
 Thái Phiên, a Vietnamese scholar and revolutionary
 Thái Quang Hoàng, a lieutenant general in the Army of the Republic of Vietnam
 Thái Thanh, a Vietnamese-American singer
 Thái Văn Dung, a Vietnamese Catholic activist
 Vico Thai, a Vietnamese-Australian actor
 Tjoa Ing Hwie or Tjoa Jien Hwie, the birth name of Surya Wonowidjojo, founder of Gudang Garam
 Marga Tjoa, the real name of Indonesian writer Marga T
 Tjoa To Hing, the birth name of Indonesian businessman Rachman Halim
 Alex Tsai, a Taiwanese politician
 Tsai Chia-Hsin, a Taiwanese badminton player
 Tsai Chih-chieh, a Taiwanese footballer (soccer player)
 Tsai Chih-Ling, American business professor and author
 Tsai Chih Chung, a Taiwanese cartoonist
 Tsai Chin, a Taiwanese popular music singer
 Tsai, Emilio Estevez, a Canadian soccer player
 Tsai Horng Chung, a Chinese-Sarawakan painter
 Tsai Hsien-tang, a Taiwanese footballer
 Tsai Hui-kai, a Taiwanese footballer (soccer player)
 Tsai Ing-wen, president and former vice premier of Taiwan
 Tsai Ying-wen, a Taiwanese Political scientist
 Jeanne Tsai, an American academic
 Jolin Tsai, a Taiwanese pop singer
 Joseph Tsai, a Canadian businessman, lawyer and philanthropist
 Kevin Tsai, a Taiwanese writer and television host
 Lauren Tsai, an American illustrator, model, and actress
 Tsai Min-you, the real name of a Taiwanese singer Evan Yo
 Ming Tsai, an American chef and host of television cooking shows
 Tsai Mi-ching, Deputy Minister of Science and Technology of the Republic of China
 Tsai Ming-Hung, a Taiwanese baseball player
 Tsai Ming-liang, a Taiwanese movie director
 Tsai Ping-kun, Deputy Mayor of Taipei
 Tsai Sen-tien, Vice Minister of Health and Welfare of the Republic of China (2016–2017)
 Tsai Shengbai, a Chinese industrialist
 , an American engineer
 , a Taiwanese politician and founder of Cathay Life Insurance Company; brother of Tsai Wan-lin and Tsai Wan-tsai (qq.v.) and father of Tsai Chen-chou and Tsai Chen-nan (businessman)
 Tsai Wan-lin, a Taiwanese billionaire and founder of Cathay Life Insurance Company; brother of Tsai Wan-chin and Tsai Wan-tsai (qq.v.) and father of Tsai Hong-tu and T. Y. Tsai
 Tsai Wan-tsai, a Taiwanese billionaire, member of the Legislative Yuan and founder of Fubon Group; brother of Tsai Wan-chin and Tsai Wan-lin (qq.v.) and father of Daniel Tsai and Richard Tsai
 Will Tsai, a Canadian magician
 Tsai Yi-chen, a Taiwanese actress
 Yu Tsai, an American photographer

See also

 :Category:Tsai family of Miaoli, a prominent Taiwanese family
 Choa Chu Kang (蔡厝港 Càicuògǎng, literally "Cai house harbor"), a suburban area in the West Region of Singapore
 Choi Uk Tsuen (蔡屋村 Càiwùcūn, literally "Cai house village"), a village in the Yuen Long district of Hong Kong
 Choy Gar (蔡家拳 Càijiāquán, literally "Cai family fist"), a Chinese martial art that was created by Choy Gau Yee (蔡九儀)
 Choy Li Fut (蔡李佛拳 Càilǐfóquán, literally "Cai, Li, and Buddha's fist"), a Chinese martial arts system named to honor the Buddhist monk Choy Fook (蔡褔) among others
 Choy Yee Bridge stop (蔡意橋站), a MTR Light Rail stop in Hong Kong
 2240 Tsai, an asteroid named after Taiwanese astronomer Tsai Changhsien

References

External links
Chua Clan Chiyang Association, Muar, Johor, Malaysia (馬來西亞柔佛麻坡蔡氏濟陽公所) website 

Cai (state)
Chinese-language surnames
Individual Chinese surnames